Totnes, Devon, England received its first borough charter from King John and the recorded list of mayors dates from 1359. The town was incorporated in 1505 with a governing structure consisting of a mayor, recorder and a single council of burgesses. A further charter in 1596 concentrated power in the hands of the town's leading merchants, redefining the corporation as a governing body of 14 ‘masters’, including the mayor, with an inferior council of 20 burgesses. The masters filled vacancies in their ranks by co-option and nominated the mayoral candidates.

The following have been mayors of Totnes:

1396–98: Walter Browning  (MP for Totnes), 1388 
1399–1400: Walter Browning
1401–03: Walter Browning
1517-1518: John Giles
1535-37: Christopher Savery
1548-49: Christopher Savery
1556-57: Christopher Savery
1585–86: Nicholas Ball
1589–90: Nicholas Hayman
1593–94: Leonard Darr
1598–99: Philip Holditch (MP for Totnes, 1601) 
1605–06: Christopher Wise 
1612-13: Richard Rodd
1620: Richard Lee (d.1620) 
1621–22: Christopher Wise
1623–24: Philip Holditch II (son of Philip Holditch above, MP for Totnes, 1626) 
1638–39: Philip Holditch II
1687 Robert Symons
1718–19: Nicholas Trist (High Sheriff of Devon, 1708)
1737–38: Nicholas Trist (High Sheriff of Devon, 1708)
1754-55: Benjamin Babbage (grandfather of Charles Babbage)
1780–81: William Adams  (MP for Plympton Erle 1796–1801 and Totnes 1801–11)
1788–89: William Adams
1797–98: William Adams
1866–67: Thomas Edward Owen
1870–1871: Robert W.Chaster
1872: Robert Bourne
1873: James Smith Rose
1874–1875: Jeffery Michelmore
1876–1877: Joseph Roe
1878: John P.F.P.Haines
1879: Jeffery Michelmore
1880–1881: Edward Harris
1882–84: Frederick Bowden 
1902-03: Dr. J. G. Gibson
 1945–1946: Lilley Ramsden (1st Female Mayor of Totnes)
1950–51: Charles Stanley Jacka  
1970–71: Jean M Gilbert

21st century
2001–02: Pruw Boswell-Harper
2003–04: J.A. Westacott
2004–05: Jim Parkes
2005–07: Pruw Boswell-Harper
2008–09: David Horsburgh
2009–10: Jean Rosemary Harrop
2010–11: Anthony Whitty
2011–12: Judy Westacott
2012–14 Pruw Boswell-Harper
2014–16: Jacqui Hodgson 
2016–17 Eleanor Cohen
2017–18 Rosie Adam
2018–19 Judy Westacott

References

Totnes
Totnes mayors